Talpa is a commune in Teleorman County, Muntenia, Romania. It is composed of five villages: Linia Costii, Rotărești, Talpa-Bâscoveni, Talpa-Ogrăzile (the commune center), and Talpa Poștei.

The commune is situated in the Wallachian Plain. It is located in the northern part of Teleorman County,  from the county seat, Alexandria.

The 1987 movie The Moromete Family, as well as its 2018 sequel, were shot in Talpa.

References

Communes in Teleorman County
Localities in Muntenia